Jonathan Pablo Bottinelli (born 14 September 1984) is an Argentine professional footballer who plays as a centre-back for San Martín SJ. He is the brother of fellow professional footballer Darío Bottinelli.

Club career

San Lorenzo
In 2007, Bottinelli helped San Lorenzo to win the Clausura tournament. On 12 August 2008, Bottinelli moved to Sampdoria, on 15 January 2009 he returned to San Lorenzo.

River Plate
On 26 July 2012, River Plate's president Daniel Passarella reported that Bottinelli joined to the club for an approximate fee of US$2 million, and was presented days later during a press conference at the city of Ezeiza. On 21 August, the AFA investigated the player for irregularities in his rights as the Chilean Primera División club Unión San Felipe with bank accounts at Virgin Islands received exactly US$1.7 million while posing as the club owner of the player's rights according to information provided by La Tercera newspaper.

León 
Bottinelli played for Club León in the 2014–15 Liga MX season.

International career
He made his debut for the Argentina national football team, in a 0–0 draw against Chile on 18 April 2007.

Honours
San Lorenzo
 Torneo de Clausura: 2007

References

External links
 
 
 

1984 births
Living people
Footballers from Buenos Aires
Association football central defenders
Argentine footballers
Argentine expatriate footballers
Argentina international footballers
Argentina under-20 international footballers
Pan American Games gold medalists for Argentina
Pan American Games medalists in football
Footballers at the 2003 Pan American Games
Medalists at the 2003 Pan American Games
Argentine people of Italian descent
Club Deportivo Universidad Católica footballers
San Lorenzo de Almagro footballers
Club Atlético River Plate footballers
U.C. Sampdoria players
Arsenal de Sarandí footballers
Club León footballers
Unión de Santa Fe footballers
Rosario Central footballers
San Martín de San Juan footballers
Serie A players
Chilean Primera División players
Argentine Primera División players
Expatriate footballers in Chile
Expatriate footballers in Italy
Expatriate footballers in Mexico
Argentine expatriate sportspeople in Chile
Argentine expatriate sportspeople in Italy
Argentine expatriate sportspeople in Mexico